This is an incomplete list of notable people associated with the University of Virginia School of Law.

Law, government, and politics

Politics 
 Charles C. Adams Jr., international arbitration lawyer, political and civic activist
 George Allen (1977) – U.S. Congressman and Senator from Virginia and Governor of Virginia
 J. Lindsay Almond (1923) – Governor of Virginia;  Judge, United States Court of Appeals for the Federal Circuit
 Nathan L. Bachman (1903) – U.S. Senator from Tennessee
 Alben W. Barkley (1900) – U.S. Senator from Kentucky, Vice President of the United States
 Evan Bayh (1981) – U.S. Senator and Governor of Indiana
 Robert Bauer (1976) – White House Counsel, General Counsel of the Obama Campaign.
 Andy Beshear (2003) – Governor of Kentucky (2019–present), Attorney General of Kentucky (2015-2019)
 Kit Bond (1963) – U.S. Senator and Governor of Missouri
 Rick Boucher (1971) – U.S Congressman from Virginia
 Debra Bowen (1979) – Secretary of State of California
 Alan Stephenson Boyd (1948) – U.S. Secretary of Transportation
 John Bridgeland (1987) – Director, USA Freedom Corps
 Harry F. Byrd Jr. (1936) – U.S. Senator from Virginia
 Millard F. Caldwell (1924) – U.S. Congressman and Governor of Florida
 Bryan Callaghan Jr. - Mayor of San Antonio, Texas for a cumulative 16 years, as well as the father of a future mayor and son of a previous mayor
 Mortimer Caplin (1940) – former Commissioner, U.S. Internal Revenue Service
 Edward M. Carmouche (1948) – chairman of the Louisiana Democratic Party from 1966 to 1968; attorney in Lake Charles, Louisiana
 Robin Carnahan (1986) – Missouri Secretary of State
 James Paul Clarke (1878) – U.S. Senator and Governor of Arkansas
 John Cornyn (1995) – U.S. Senator from Texas and Senate Majority Whip, Attorney General of Texas
 Tom Davis (1975) – U.S. Congressman from Virginia
 Frank M. Dixon (1943) – Governor of Alabama
 Luis G. Fortuño (1985) – Governor of Puerto Rico
 Tom Donilon (1985) – U.S. National Security Advisor
 Paul Erickson – American conservative political operative, subject to federal investigation into Russian interference in the 2016 United States elections
 Fred Fielding (1964) – White House Counsel
 William Meade Fishback (1855) – Governor of Arkansas
 Randy Forbes (1977) – U.S. Congressman from Virginia
 Doug Gansler (1989) – Attorney General of Maryland
 Jim Gilmore (1977) – Governor of Virginia
 Virgil Goode (1973) – U.S. Congressman from Virginia
 Lee E. Goodman (1990) – Chairman, Federal Election Commission
 Toby J. Heytens (2000) - Solicitor General of Virginia
 Pete Holmes (1984) – Seattle City Attorney
 William J. Howell (1967) – Speaker of the Virginia House of Delegates
 Bob Inglis (1984) – U.S. Congressman from South Carolina
 Kim Keenan (1987) – General Counsel, National Association for the Advancement of Colored People
 John Neely Kennedy (1977) – U.S. Senator from Louisiana.
 Max Kennedy (1992) – Political activist and author; son of Robert F. Kennedy and nephew of John F. Kennedy and Ted Kennedy
 Michael LeMoyne Kennedy (1984) – Political and social activist; son of Robert F. Kennedy and nephew of John F. Kennedy and Ted Kennedy
 Ted Kennedy (1959) – U.S. Senator from Massachusetts, 1980 Democratic Presidential Candidate
 Robert F. Kennedy (1951) – Attorney General of the United States, U.S. Senator from New York, 1968 Democratic Presidential Candidate
 Robert F. Kennedy Jr. (1979) – Environmental activist; son of Robert F. Kennedy and nephew of John F. Kennedy and Ted Kennedy
 Angus King (1969) – U.S. Senator and Former Governor of Maine
 Sheila Jackson-Lee (1975) – U.S. Congresswoman from Texas
 Sean Patrick Maloney (1992) – U.S. Congressman from New York
 Thurgood Marshall Jr. (1981) – Cabinet Secretary under U.S. President Bill Clinton
 Deborah Platt Majoras (1989) – Chairman of the Federal Trade Commission
 Donald McEachin (1986) – U.S. Congressman from Virginia
 George McMillan (1979) - Lieutenant Governor of Alabama, Alabama Senate, Alabama House of Representatives
 Robert Mueller (1973) – Director of the Federal Bureau of Investigation
 Janet Napolitano (1983) – U.S. Secretary of Homeland Security,  Governor of Arizona, President of the University of California
 Bill Nelson (1968) – U.S. Senator from Florida
 Kirstjen Nielsen (1999) – U.S. Secretary of Homeland Security
 Henry A. Osborn Jr. (1884–1918), American politician
 Ken Paxton (1991) – Attorney General of Texas
 Matthew S. Petersen (1999) – Commissioner and former Chairman, Federal Election Commission
 W. Robert Pearson (1968) – U.S. Ambassador to Turkey
 H. Foster Pettit – Member of the Kentucky House of Representatives, 1965 to 1970; mayor of Lexington, Kentucky, 1972 to 1978; practiced law in Lexington
 Heather Podesta (1997) – American lobbyist
 Trevor Potter (1982) – Chairman of Federal Election Commission
 Franklin Delano Roosevelt Jr. (1940) – U.S. Congressman from New York, and son of President of the United States Franklin D. Roosevelt.
 Hugh D. Scott (1922) – U.S. Senator from Pennsylvania; Minority Leader of the United States Senate
 William B. Schultz (1990) – General Counsel, United States Department of Health and Human Services
 Charles Robb (1973) – U.S. Senator and Governor of Virginia
 Faryar Shirzad – advisor to U.S. President George W. Bush
 Howard Worth Smith (1903) – U.S. Congressman from Virginia
 John C. Stennis (1927) – U.S. Senator from Mississippi
 John V. Tunney (1959) – U.S. Senator from California
 John Warner (1953) – U.S. Senator from Virginia
 Lowell P. Weicker Jr. (1958) – U.S. Senator and Governor of Connecticut
 Sheldon Whitehouse (1982) – U.S. Senator from Rhode Island
 Woodrow Wilson (attended 1879) – President of the United States
 Frank Wisner – Head of the Office of Strategic Services and head of the Directorate of Plans of the CIA during the 1950s
 Peter S. Vincent (1995) – Principal Legal Advisor, United States Immigration and Customs Enforcement
 Andy Vollmer (1978) – Acting General Counsel, United States Securities and Exchange Commission

Law 

 G. Steven Agee (1977) – Judge, United States Court of Appeals for the Fourth Circuit
 Carol Amon (1971) – Judge, U.S. District Court for the Eastern District of New York
 John Antoon (2001, LL.M) – Judge, United States District Court for the Middle District of Florida
 Alice M. Batchelder (1988) – Chief Judge, United States Court of Appeals for the Sixth Circuit
 Lewis Babcock (1998, LL.M) – Judge, United States District Court for the District of Colorado
 Peter Beer (1986, LL.M) – Judge, United States District Court for the Eastern District of Louisiana
 Carol A. Beier (2004, LL.M) – Judge, Kansas Supreme Court
 Robert Benham (1990, LL.M) – Judge, Georgia Supreme Court
 Duane Benton (1995, LL.M) – Judge United States Court of Appeals for the Eighth Circuit
 Robert Beezer (1956) – Judge, United States Court of Appeals for the Ninth Circuit
 Susan H. Black (1984) – Judge, United States Court of Appeals for the Eleventh Circuit
 John White Brockenbrough – Judge, United States District Court for the Western District of Virginia, founder and former Dean of the Washington and Lee University School of Law
 Mary Beck Briscoe (1990, LL.M) – Chief Judge, U.S. Court of Appeals for the Tenth Circuit
 John T. Broderick Jr. (1972) – Chief Justice, New Hampshire Supreme Court
 James O. Browning (1981) – Judge, United States District Court for the District of New Mexico
 Pasco Bowman II (1979, LL.M) – Judge, United States Court of Appeals for the Eighth Circuit
 Janice Rogers Brown (2004, LL.M) – Judge, United States Court of Appeals for the District of Columbia Circuit
 Albert Vickers Bryan (1921) – Judge, United States Court of Appeals for the Fourth Circuit
 John D. Butzner Jr. (1941, LL.M) – Judge, United States Court of Appeals for the Fourth Circuit
 Consuelo María Callahan (2004, LL.M) – Judge United States Court of Appeals for the Ninth Circuit
 Jack Tarpley Camp Jr. (1973) – Judge, United States District Court for the Northern District of Georgia
 Ronald D. Castille (1971) – Chief Justice, Pennsylvania Supreme Court
 Robert J. Conrad (1983) – Judge,  United States District Court for the Western District of North Carolina
 Julian Abele Cook Jr. (1988, LL.M) – Judge, United States District Court for the Eastern District of Michigan
 James L. Dennis (1984) – Judge, United States Court of Appeals for the Fifth Circuit
 Hardy Cross Dillard – Dean, UVA Law School; Judge, International Court of Justice
 Donal O'Donnell (1983, LL.M) – Chief Justice of Ireland, Supreme Court of Ireland
 Robert D. Durham (1998, LL.M) – Justice, Oregon Supreme Court
 James Larry Edmondson (1990, LL.M) – Judge, United States Court of Appeals for the Eleventh Circuit
 Richard Alan Enslen (1986, LL.M) – Judge, United States District Court for the Western District of Michigan
 Orinda D. Evans (1998, LL.M) – Judge, United States District Court for the Northern District of Georgia
 Linda Fairstein (1972), author and prosecutor
 Jerry Falwell Jr. (1987) – Chancellor, Liberty University
 John A. Field Jr. (1935) – Judge, United States Court of Appeals for the Fourth Circuit
 Louise W. Flanagan (1988) – Judge, United States District Court for the Eastern District of North Carolina
 Paul C. Gartzke (1992) – Presiding Judge, Wisconsin Court of Appeals
 Julia Smith Gibbons (1975) – Judge, United States Court of Appeals for the Sixth Circuit
 John A. Gibney Jr. (1976) – Judge, United States District Court for the Eastern District of Virginia
 George H. Goodrich (1952) – Judge, Superior Court of the District of Columbia
 John Gleeson  (1980) – Judge, United States District Court for the Eastern District of New York
 Todd Graves (1991) - U.S. Attorney, Western District of Missouri
 Thomas B. Griffith (1985) – Judge, United States Court of Appeals for the District of Columbia Circuit
 Asher Grunis (1972, LL.M) – President, Supreme Court of Israel
 Michael Daly Hawkins (1998, LL.M) – Judge, United States Court of Appeals for the Ninth Circuit
 Tim Heaphy (1991) – U.S. Attorney, Western District of Virginia
 Sven Erik Holmes (1980) – Judge, United States District Court for the Northern District of Oklahoma
 Virginia Hopkins (1977) – Judge, United States District Court for the Northern District of Alabama
 Lynn Nettleton Hughes (1992, LL.M) – Judge United States District Court for the Southern District of Texas
 Willis Hunt (1990, LL.M) – Judge, United States District Court for the Northern District of Georgia
 Raymond Alvin Jackson (1973) – Judge, United States District Court for the Eastern District of Virginia
 Brendan Johnson – U.S. Attorney, District of South Dakota
 Denise R. Johnson (LL.M., 1995) – first woman appointed to the Vermont Supreme Court
 James Parker Jones (1965) – Chief Judge, United States District Court for the Western District of Virginia
 Daniel Porter Jordan III (1993) – Judge, United States District Court for the Southern District of Mississippi
 Barbara Milano Keenan (1992, LL.M) – Judge, United States Court of Appeals for the Fourth Circuit
 James Kinkeade (1998, LL.M.) – Judge, United States District Court for the Northern District of Texas
 Cynthia D. Kinser (1977) – Chief Justice, Supreme Court of Virginia
 Edwin Kneedler (1975) – Deputy United States Solicitor General
 Jeannette Knoll (Master of Laws, 1996) – Associate Justice of the Louisiana Supreme Court
 Benson Everett Legg (1973) – Judge, U.S. District Court for the District of Maryland
 Peter K. Leisure (1958) – Judge, United States District Court for the Southern District of New York
 Donald Lemons (1976) – Chief Justice Supreme Court of Virginia
 Stephen N. Limbaugh Jr. (1998, LL.M) – Judge, United States District Court for the Eastern District of Missouri
 Kermit Lipez (1990, LL.M.) – Judge, United States Court of Appeals for the First Circuit
 J. Michael Luttig (1981) – former Judge, United States Court of Appeals for the Fourth Circuit and current senior vice president and general counsel at Boeing Co.
 James Clark McReynolds (1884) – former Justice, United States Supreme Court
 Blanche M. Manning (1992, LL.M) – Judge, United States District Court for the Northern District of Illinois
 Boyce F. Martin Jr. (1963, LL.M) – Judge, United States Court of Appeals for the Sixth Circuit
 Mark D. Martin (1998) – Judge North Carolina Supreme Court
 Amit Priyavadan Mehta (1997) – Judge, United States District Court for the District of Columbia
 Zane David Memeger (1991) – U.S. Attorney, Eastern District of Pennsylvania (2010-2016)
 Lawrence E. Meyers (1998, LL.M) – Judge of the Texas Court of Criminal Appeals since 1993; based in Fort Worth
 Donald M. Middlebrooks (2004, LL.M) – Judge, United States District Court for the Southern District of Florida
 Michael P. Mills (2001, LL.M) – Judge, United States District Court for the Northern District of Mississippi
 Richard Henry Mills (1982, LL.M) – Judge, United States District Court for the Central District of Illinois
 Paul Redmond Michel (1966) – Chief Judge, United States Court of Appeals for the Federal Circuit
 Norman K. Moon (1988, LL.M) – Judge, United States District Court for the Western District of Virginia
 John T. Morton (1994) – Assistant Secretary, United States Immigration and Customs Enforcement
 Diana Gribbon Motz (1968) – Judge, United States Court of Appeals for the Fourth Circuit
 J. Frederick Motz (1967) – Judge, United States District Court for the District of Maryland
 William Theodore Moore Jr. (2001, LL.M)- Judge United States District Court for the Southern District of Georgia
 Glenn Murdock (1981) – Justice, Supreme Court of Alabama
 Alan Eugene Norris (1986) – Judge, United States Court of Appeals for the Sixth Circuit
 Diarmuid O'Scannlain (1992, LL.M) – Judge, United States Court of Appeals for the Ninth Circuit
 John Pelander (1998, LL.M) Justice, Supreme Court of Arizona
 Cleo E. Powell (1982) – Justice, Supreme Court of Virginia
 William R. Quinlan(1989, LL.M)- Justice, Illinois Appellate Court, Corporation Counsel to the City of Chicago
John N. Raudabaugh (1977, J.D.) - Member, U.S. National Labor Relations Board - 1990-1993
 Stanley Forman Reed (1908) – former Justice, United States Supreme Court
 Carlton W. Reeves (1989) – Judge, United States District Court for the Southern District of Mississippi
 Kenneth Francis Ripple (1968) – Judge, United States Court of Appeals for the Seventh Circuit
 Judith Ann Wilson Rogers (1988, LL.M) Judge, United States Court of Appeals for the District of Columbia Circuit
 John Roll (1990, LL.M) – Judge, United States District Court for the District of Arizona
 Robert D. Rucker (1998, LL.M) – Judge, Indiana Supreme Court
 Thomas G. Saylor (2004, LL.M) – Judge, Pennsylvania Supreme Court
 Michael H. Schneider Sr. (2001, LL.M) – Judge, United States District Court for the Eastern District of Texas
 Arthur J. Schwab (1972) – Judge, United States District Court for the Western District of Pennsylvania
 Leah Ward Sears (1995, LL.M) – Chief Justice, Georgia Supreme Court
 G. Kendall Sharp (1963) – Judge, United States District Court for the Middle District of Florida
 Robert J. Shelby (1988) – Judge, United States District Court for the District of Utah
 Randall Terry Shepard (1995 LL.M) – Chief Justice, Indiana Supreme Court
 Walter King Stapleton (1984, LL.M) – Judge, United States Court of Appeals for the Third Circuit
 W. Taylor Reveley, III (1968) – President, The College of William and Mary, former dean and law professor at William & Mary Law School
 Arthur J. Schwab (1972) – Judge, United States District Court for the Western District of Pennsylvania
 Edward Samuel Smith (1947) – Judge, United States Court of Appeals for the Federal Circuit
 William Lloyd Standish (1956) – Judge, United States District Court for the Western District of Pennsylvania
 Murray Merle Schwartz (1982, LL.M) – Judge, United States District Court for the District of Delaware
 Randall Terry Shepard (1995, LL.M) – Chief Justice, Indiana Supreme Court
 Louis L. Stanton (1955) – Judge, United States District Court for the Southern District of New York
 Myron T. Steele (1970) – Chief Justice, Delaware Supreme Court
 Chester J. Straub (1961) – Judge, United States Court of Appeals for the Second Circuit
 Richard F. Suhrheinrich (1990, LL.M) – Senior Judge, United States Court of Appeals for the Sixth Circuit
 Richard Barclay Surrick (1982, LL.M) – Judge, United States District Court for the Eastern District of Pennsylvania
 Eric C. Taylor (1988) - Presiding Judge, Los Angeles County Superior Court
 Debra Todd (2004, LL.M) – Judge, Pennsylvania Supreme Court
 Juan R. Torruella (1984, LL.M) – Judge, United States Court of Appeals for the First Circuit
 Joyce White Vance (1985) – United States Attorney, Northern District of Alabama
 Paul R. Verkuil (1967) – Chairman, Administrative Conference of the United States; former President of College of William & Mary and former Dean of Cardozo Law School
 James B. Whitfield (1886) – State Attorney General, Justice of the Supreme Court of Florida
 Michael J. Wilkins (2001, LL.M) – Associate Chief Justice, Utah Supreme Court
 J. Harvie Wilkinson (1972) – Judge, United States Court of Appeals for the Fourth Circuit
 Glen Morgan Williams (1948) – Judge, United States District Court for the Western District of Virginia
 Victor J. Wolski (1991) – Judge, United States Court of Federal Claims
 James Andrew Wynn (1995, LL.M) – Judge, United States Court of Appeals for the Fourth Circuit
 Eugene E. Siler Jr. (1963) – Judge, United States Court of Appeals for the Sixth Circuit

Academia 

 Richard Bonnie (1969) – Harrison Foundation Professor of Medicine and Law, University of Virginia Law School
 Stephen Bainbridge (1985) –  William D. Warren Distinguished Professor of Law, UCLA School of Law
 Charles M. Elson (1985) –   Edgar S. Woolard Jr. Chair in Corporate Governance, Professor of Finance, University of Delaware
 Patrick Finnegan (1979) – 12th Academic Dean of U.S. Military Academy and 25th President of Longwood University
 Gary Francione (1981) – Board of Governors Distinguished Professor of Law and Nicholas deB. Katzenbach Scholar of Law and Philosophy, Rutgers Law School
 Elizabeth Garrett (1988) – 13th President of Cornell University
 A.E. Dick Howard (1961) – White Burkett Miller Distinguished Professor of Law and Public Affairs, University of Virginia Law School
 John Jeffries (1973) – 12th Dean and David and Mary Harrison Distinguished Professor of Law, University of Virginia Law School
 Andrew Leipold (1985) – Edwin M. Adams Professor of Law, University of Illinois College of Law
 M. Elizabeth Magill (1995) – Provost of the University of Virginia, 13th Dean of Stanford Law School
 Michael McCann (2002) – Founding Director of the UNH Law Sports and Entertainment Law Institute, University of New Hampshire School of Law
 William Ephraim Mikell (1894) - Dean of the University of Pennsylvania Law School
 Blake Morant (1978) – Dean and Robert Kramer Research Professor, George Washington University Law School 
 James Pfander (1982) –  Owen L. Coon Professor of Law, Northwestern University Pritzker School of Law
 James E. Ryan (1992) – President of the University of Virginia
 W. Taylor Reveley IV (2002) – 26th President of Longwood University
 Jacob Rooksby (2007) – Dean of Gonzaga University School of Law
 Micah Schwartzman (2005) – Hardy Cross Dillard Professor of Law, University of Virginia Law School
 David Skeel (1987) –  S. Samuel Arsht Professor of Corporate Law, University of Pennsylvania Law School
 Paul B. Stephan (1977) – John C. Jeffries, Jr., Distinguished Professor of Law, University of Virginia Law School
 Lyon Gardiner Tyler (1877) - President of the College of William & Mary 
 Joyce Vance (1985) –  Distinguished Professor of the Practice of Law, University of Alabama School of Law

Civil Rights 

 J. Richard Cohen (1979) – former president and legal director of Southern Poverty Law Center

Sports 

 Griff Aldrich (1999) – Head men's basketball coach, Longwood University

Media 

 Louis Auchincloss (1941) – Novelist
 David Baldacci (1986) – Novelist
 Linda Fairstein (1972) – Novelist
 Emily Giffin (1997) – Novelist
 Lee Habeeb (1991) – Conservative talk radio producer
 Philip K. Howard (1974) - Writer
 Laura Ingraham (1991) – Radio talk-show host
 Andrew Scheinman (1973) – Movie producer
 Will Shortz (1977) – Crossword Editor, The New York Times
 Evan Thomas (1977) – Editor, Newsweek

Business 

R. Hewitt Pate (1987) — General Counsel, Chevron
Craig Silliman (1994) — General Counsel, Verizon
 Thomas M. Moriarty (1989) — Executive Vice President, Chief Policy and External Affairs Officer, and General Counsel, CVS Health
 Donald Dell (1964) – Founder of ProServ
 Tim Finchem (1973) – Commissioner and CEO, PGA TOUR
 Bruce Karsh (1980) – Investor, Founder and Co-Chairman of Oaktree Capital Management, Executive Board Member of Golden State Warriors
 Peter S. Kaufman (1978) – Investment banker, president of the Gordian Group LLC
 Bowie Kuhn (1950) – Former Major League Baseball Commissioner
 Deborah Platt Majoras (1989) – Vice President and General Counsel, Procter & Gamble
 Ted Mathas (1992) – Chairman, President, and CEO, New York Life Insurance Company
 Alexander F. Mathews, M.A. 1856 – President and Founder of Bank of Lewisburg and First National Bank of Ronceverte
 John E. Osborn (1983) – Former Executive Vice President and General Counsel, Cephalon, Inc.; former member U.S. Advisory Commission on Public Diplomacy
 Michael Slive (1965) – Current commissioner of the Southeastern Conference (SEC), and formerly the first commissioner of both Conference USA and Great Midwest Conference
 DeMaurice Smith (1989) – Executive Director, National Football League Players' Association
 Michael C. Wholley (1977) – General Counsel, NASA
 Bob Wright (1968) – Former Chairman and CEO of NBC
 Don Yee (1987) – NFL sports agent

References